The Convair 880 is an American narrow-body jet airliner produced by the Convair division of General Dynamics. It was designed to compete with the Boeing 707 and Douglas DC-8 by being smaller but faster, a niche that failed to create demand. Only 65 Convair 880s were produced over the lifetime of the production run from 1959 to 1962, and General Dynamics eventually withdrew from the airliner market after considering the 880 project a failure. The Convair 990 Coronado was a stretched and faster variant of the 880.

Development

Convair began development of a medium-range commercial jet in April 1956, to compete with announced products from Boeing and Douglas. Initially the design was called the Skylark, but the name was later changed to the Golden Arrow, then Convair 600 and then finally the 880, both numbers referring to its top speed of 600 mph (970 km/h) or 880 ft/s (268 m/s). It was powered by General Electric CJ-805-3 turbojets, a civilian version of the J79 which powered the Lockheed F-104 Starfighter, McDonnell Douglas F-4 Phantom, and Convair B-58 Hustler.

The first example of the Model 22 FAA Type Certificate, initial production version (no prototype was built) made its maiden flight on 27 January 1959. After production started, the Federal Aviation Administration mandated additional instrumentation, which Convair added by placing a "raceway" hump on the top of the fuselage, rather than ripping apart the interiors over the wing area.  The final assembly of the 880 and 990 took place at the Convair facilities in San Diego, California.

Design

The airliner never became widely used, and the production line shut down after only three years. The 880's five-abreast seating made it unattractive to airlines, while Boeing was able to outcompete it with the Boeing 720, which could be sold at a significantly lower price, as it was a minimal modification of the existing 707. In addition, the General Electric engines had a higher specific fuel consumption than the Boeing's Pratt & Whitney JT3Cs.

General Dynamics lost around $185 million over the lifetime of the project, although some sources estimate much higher losses. The aircraft were involved in 17 accidents and five hijackings.

A modified version of the basic 880 was the "-M" version, which incorporated four leading-edge slats per wing, Krueger leading-edge flaps between the fuselage and inboard engines, power-boosted rudder, added engine thrust, increased fuel capacity, stronger landing gear, greater adjustment to seating pitch, and a simpler overhead compartment arrangement.

A more major modification to the 880 became the Convair 990, produced in parallel with the 880-M between 1961 and 1963. Swissair named theirs Coronado, after an island off the San Diego coast and where the first 990 landed.

Operational history

The design entered service with Delta Air Lines in May 1960, slightly modified as the 880-22M, having newer-version 805-3B engines. The 880s were flown by Cathay Pacific, Delta, Japan Airlines, Northeast Airlines, Swissair, TWA, and VIASA.

As they left commercial service, many 880s were bought by American Jet Industries for various uses. One example was converted to freighter use in 1974, and flew until 1982 with various companies. Another was used to train FAA flight examiners until it was destroyed by a minor explosion in the cargo hold in 1995. Most of the remaining examples were scrapped by 2000.

The United States Navy acquired one 880-M in 1980, modifying it as an in-flight tanker. It had been purchased new from Convair by the FAA, and used for 18 years. Unofficially designated UC-880, it was assigned to the Naval Air Test Center at NAS Patuxent River, Maryland, and employed in Tomahawk cruise missile testing and aircraft refueling procedures. The UC-880 was damaged in a cargo-hold explosive decompression test at NAS Patuxent River, Maryland, in 1995. The aircraft was judged to still have been controllable using backup systems had the decompression occurred in flight.

Operators

Civil operators

(♠ = original operators)

Military operators

 United States Navy – one Convair UC-880 testbed/Aerial refueling

Accidents and incidents
 On May 23, 1960, Delta Air Lines Flight 1903, a CV-880-22-1 (N8804E), crashed on takeoff at Atlanta Municipal Airport (now Atlanta Hartsfield-Jackson International Airport), resulting in the loss of all four crew members. This flight was to be a training sortie for two Delta captains who were being type-rated on the 880. At rotation, the aircraft pitched nose up, rolled left, and then back more steeply to the right, at which time it struck the ground, broke apart, and was consumed by a fire.
 On August 26, 1966, a Japan Air Lines CV-880-22M-3 (JA8030) crashed on takeoff from Haneda Airport during a training flight, killing all five crew members. When the nose lifted up, the aircraft yawed to the left, for reasons unknown. The number one engine struck the runway and the aircraft left the runway and the nose went back down. All four engines separated, as well as the nose and left main gear, and the aircraft caught fire. The aircraft was leased from Japan Domestic Airlines.
 On November 5, 1967, Cathay Pacific Flight 033, a CV-880-22M-3 (VR-HFX) overran the runway on takeoff from Kai Tak Airport following a loss of control after the right nosewheel blew, killing 1 of 127 on board.
 On November 20, 1967, TWA Flight 128 crashed on approach to Cincinnati/Northern Kentucky International Airport. Seventy people were killed and twelve survived.
 On June 24, 1969, Japan Air Lines Flight 90, a CV-880-22M-3 (JA8028, Kikyo), crashed on takeoff from Grant County Airport, Washington, killing three of the five crew members. The flight was to simulate a takeoff with one engine out. Power was reduced to the number four engine during takeoff, but the aircraft continued to yaw to the right until the number four engine struck the runway. The aircraft slid off the runway and caught fire.
 On June 15, 1972, a bomb exploded on board Cathay Pacific Flight 700Z over Pleiku, South Vietnam, killing all 81 passengers and crew on board.
 On December 20, 1972, North Central Airlines Flight 575, a McDonnell Douglas DC-9-31, collided during its takeoff roll with Delta Air Lines Flight 954, a Convair 880 (N8807E), as the Convair 880 taxied across the runway at O'Hare International Airport in Chicago, Illinois. Only two people on the Convair 880 were injured, but 10 people died and 15 were injured on board the DC-9.
 On August 20, 1977, a Monarch Aviation CV-880-22-2 (N8817E) struck trees and crashed shortly after takeoff from Juan Santamaria International Airport, Costa Rica, due to overloading, killing the three crew.
 On November 3, 1980, a Latin Carga CV-880-22-2 (YV-145C) crashed on takeoff from Simon Bolivar International Airport, Caracas, Venezuela, during a crew training flight, killing the four crew.
 On May 11, 1983, a Groth Air CV-880-22-2 (N880SR) burned out at Juarez International Airport, Mexico City.
 In October 1986, an FAA CV-880-22M-3 (N5863) was intentionally destroyed in a test with anti-misting kerosene fuel additive at Mojave, California.

Surviving aircraft

 1 – Cockpit on display at the Delta Flight Museum in Atlanta, Georgia
 3 – Forward fuselage on display at the Aviation Hall of Fame and Museum of New Jersey in Teterboro, New Jersey. It is on loan from Scroggins Aviation.
 23 – Forward fuselage on display at the Tillamook Air Museum in Tillamook, Oregon. It is on loan from Scroggins Aviation.
 35 – Complete aircraft in storage at Scroggins Aviation in Mojave, California.
 38 –Lisa Marie – On display at Graceland in Memphis, Tennessee: Formerly N8809E with Delta, Elvis Presley purchased the aircraft in 1975 and named it after his daughter. In January 2015, it was put up for sale and eventually bought back by Elvis Presley Enterprises and displayed as part of the Presley Museum collection.
 58 – Converted into a lodge in East London, South Africa: This airframe was converted into a business jet in the 1970s (registration N88CH). It was purchased by the Ciskei government in 1987 intended for use by president Lennox Sebe, but remained at Bhisho Airport for several years due to a lack of funds to make it airworthy. In 1992, it was bought by Billy Nel (now Eastern Cape Provincial Finance MEC), who had it transported to his private residence north of East London, South Africa. The 1970s, VIP interior with couches, beds and a bar remain intact and it is used for private functions. One of the engines was donated to the Stutterheim Engine Museum.

Specifications

See also

References

Further reading

External links

  Aerofiles — Data and photos of Convair aircraft
 Goleta Air and Space Museum — Information and pictures of various Convair 880s.
 ConvairJet.com — An organization focused on preserving several Convair 880s.
 Aviation-Safety.net — Convair 880 Accident Database.
 YouTube video of a Delta Airlines Convair 880
 Convair Jet Airliners 880M 990 — Marketing materials for the Convair 880 Jetliner.

880
1950s United States airliners
UC-880
Quadjets
Low-wing aircraft
Aircraft first flown in 1959